The epithet the Conqueror may refer to:

 Thutmose III (c. 1477 BC–1425 BC), Egyptian pharaoh
 William the Conqueror (1028-1087), Duke of Normandy and King of England
 Afonso I of Portugal (1109–1185), King of Portugal
 Valdemar II of Denmark (1170–1241), King of Denmark
 James I of Aragon (1208–1276), King of Aragon
 John V, Duke of Brittany (1339–1399), Duke of Brittany, also known as Jean le Conquéreur 
 Mehmed II (1432–1481), Sultan of the Ottoman Empire

See also
 John the Conqueror, an African-American folk hero
 Kang the Conqueror, a Marvel Comics villain

Lists of people by epithet